Eilema claudei is a moth of the subfamily Arctiinae. It was described by Hervé de Toulgoët in 1980. It is found in Cameroon.

References

claudei
Moths described in 1980